Jones County is a county in the central portion of the U.S. state of Georgia. As of the 2020 census, the population was 28,347. The county seat is Gray. The county was created on December 10, 1807, and named after U.S. Representative James Jones.

History
Jones County, along with Morgan County, Putnam County, and Old Randolph, were established by an act of the Georgia General Assembly on December 10, 1807, from land that had originally been part Baldwin County in 1803 and, earlier, part of the Creek Nation. Jones County was originally bounded by a line running north 56° east to Commissioners Creek, then north 15° west to Cedar Creek, then up the creek to corner Randolph County and Putnam County, then along a line to Ocmulgee River, then down the river to where the old county line between Wilkinson County and Baldwin County was. It excluded parts of what is now Bibb County east of the Ocmulgee River, including the location of Fort Benjamin Hawkins, as they were part of a reserve guaranteed to the Creek Nation. Those areas were later added to Jones County after the Treaty of Indian Springs.

During the initial months of the county's existence, a town known as Albany served as the county seat. The town was renamed Clinton and was established as the county seat by the Georgia General Assembly on December 22, 1808. Clinton was incorporated as in 1816. During the 1800s Clinton grew as a center of commerce and the cotton trade. Clinton remained one of the most populous cities in Georgia in the mid-1800s.

In December 1810 Jones County gained a portion of Putnam County between Cedar Creek and their original border. In December 1822 Bibb County was established and Jones County lost some of its land to that county.

During the early 19th century, Jones County had a rapid population increase. The peak came around 1835, when the county ranked third or fourth among all of the state's counties in agricultural wealth. After 1835, soil erosion and lack of funds to develop property drove many farmers to newly opened land elsewhere in Georgia.

Before the American Civil War, a few factories sprang up in the county, including a cotton gin factory at Griswoldville in the southern portion of the county and a woolen factory at Wallace. Griswoldville was founded by Samuel Griswold in the 1850s. During the Civil War, the cotton gin factory was reformatted so it could produce pistols and other weapons for the Confederate Army. Griswoldville was located on the railway linking Macon to Savannah, and became a prime target in 1864 as the Union Army moved through Georgia. On November 20, 1864, the town and the factories in it were burned as part of Sherman's March to the Sea. Days later the Battle of Griswoldville took place in the area. The town of Griswoldville was not rebuilt.

Many other areas in Jones County were damaged by the Union Army during that time period. The Jarrell Plantation State Historic Site in Jones County showcases one of the few and well-preserved antebellum plantations in Georgia.

In the 1890s a railroad line owned by the Central of Georgia Railway named the Macon & Northern Railroad was built through the county and bypassed Clinton by a mile after citizens wanted the line to not pass through the town. By the early 1900s the population had shifted northeastward and the city of Gray was established. On June 27, 1905, the citizens of Jones County voted on the issues of moving the county seat from Clinton to Gray. The results were 1,289 votes in favor of moving the county seat to Gray and 51 votes for keeping the county seat at Clinton. On August 9, 1905, Gray became the new county seat of Jones County.

Father and son Alonzo and James D. Green were innocent African-Americans lynched near Round Oak and Wayside, Jones County in retaliation for the murder of popular white farmer Silas Hardin Turner on July 4, 1915. A third man, William Bostick, was also lynched on this day. None of those killed received a trial.

Notable people
 Terrance Gore, professional baseball player with the Kansas City Royals, Chicago Cubs, New York Yankees,Atlanta Braves and New York Mets; part of the World Series team with Kansas City in 2015 and Atlanta Braves in 2021.
 William Lee, early Alabama politician; immigrated to Jones County from England
 Sadie Gray Mays (1900-1969), social worker and wife of college president Benjamin Mays; born in Gray
 Otis Redding, singer, lived on a ranch he owned in Jones County during the height of his music career. A marker in downtown Gray pays tribute to Redding.
John T. Edge, writer, commentator, director of the Southern Foodways Alliance, and most visibly, host of the SEC Network’stravel and food show, *True South*. Edge is author of several books on Southern food and contributes regularly to the Oxford American, the New York Times, and Garden & Gun.

Geography

The western half of Jones County, west of Gray, is located in the Upper Ocmulgee River sub-basin of the Altamaha River basin. The northeastern quarter of the county, north of Gray, is located in the Upper Oconee River sub-basin of the same Altamaha River basin, while the southeastern corner of Jones County is located in the Lower Oconee River sub-basin of the larger Altamaha River basin.

Major highways

  U.S. Route 129
  State Route 11
  State Route 18
  State Route 22
  State Route 44
  State Route 49
  State Route 57
  State Route 540 (Fall Line Freeway)

Rivers
 Ocmulgee River

Adjacent counties
 Jasper County - north
 Putnam County - northeast
 Baldwin County - east
 Twiggs County - southeast
 Wilkinson County - southeast
 Bibb County - south
 Monroe County - west

National protected areas
 Oconee National Forest (part)
 Piedmont National Wildlife Refuge (part)

Demographics

2020 census

As of the 2020 United States census, there were 28,347 people, 10,701 households, and 7,670 families residing in the county.

2010 census
As of the 2010 United States Census, there were 28,669 people, 10,586 households, and 7,973 families residing in the county. The racial makeup of the county was 73.2% white, 24.4% black or African American, 0.7% Asian, 0.2% American Indian, 0.4% from other races, and 1.1% from two or more races. Those of Hispanic or Latino origin made up 1.1% of the population. In terms of ancestry, 15.2% were American, 10.6% were Irish, 10.4% were English, and 5.4% were German.

Of the 10,586 households, 38.8% had children under the age of 18 living with them, 55.7% were married couples living together, 14.5% had a female householder with no husband present, 24.7% were non-families, and 21.4% of all households were made up of individuals. The average household size was 2.68 and the average family size was 3.10. The median age was 38.7 years.

The median income for a household in the county was $50,717 and the median income for a family was $56,038. Males had a median income of $44,769 versus $32,240 for females. The per capita income for the county was $21,598. About 10.4% of families and 13.1% of the population were below the poverty line, including 14.5% of those under age 18 and 20.3% of those age 65 or over.

Education

Communities
 Blountsville
 Bradley
 Clinton
 Fortville
 Gray (county seat)
 Haddock
 Round Oak
 Wayside

Politics

See also

 National Register of Historic Places listings in Jones County, Georgia
List of counties in Georgia

References

 

 
Georgia (U.S. state) counties
1807 establishments in Georgia (U.S. state)
Populated places established in 1807
Macon metropolitan area, Georgia